Björn Knutsson (born 1938 in Sweden) is a former speedway rider who won the Speedway World Championship in 1965 and was a four-time winner of the World Team Cup. He gained the nickname 'The Crown Prince' for his speedway success. He also won the Speedway Swedish Individual Championship in 1961 and 1963.

World Final Appearances

Individual World Championship
 1961 -  Malmö, Malmö Stadion - 2nd - 12pts + 3pts
 1962 -  London, Wembley Stadium - 4th - 10pts + 2pts
 1963 -  London, Wembley Stadium - 2nd - 13pts
 1964 -  Gothenburg, Ullevi - 5th - 10pts
 1965 -  London, Wembley Stadium - Winner - 14pts
 1966 -  Gothenburg, Ullevi - 10th - 5pts

World Team Cup
 1960 -  Gothenburg, Ullevi (with Ove Fundin / Rune Sörmander / Olle Nygren) - Winner - 44pts (9)
 1961 -  Wrocław, Olympic Stadium (with Rune Sörmander / Ove Fundin / Per Tage Svensson / Soren Sjosten) - 2nd - 30pts (7)
 1962 -  Slaný (with Ove Fundin / Sören Sjösten / Göte Nordin / Rune Sörmander) - Winner - 36pts (10)
 1963 -  Vienna, Stadion Wien (with Ove Fundin / Per Olof Söderman / Göte Nordin / Rune Sörmander) - Winner - 37pts (11)
 1964 -  Abensberg, Abensberg Stadion (with Ove Fundin / Göte Nordin / Rune Sörmander / Sören Sjösten) - Winner - 34pts (11)
 1965 -  Kempten (with Ove Fundin / Bengt Jansson / Göte Nordin) - 2nd - 33pts (11)
 1966 -  Wrocław, Olympic Stadium (with Ove Fundin / Leif Enecrona / Göte Nordin / Leif Larsson) - 3rd - 22pts (11)

References 

1938 births
Living people
Swedish speedway riders
Individual Speedway World Champions
West Ham Hammers riders
Southampton Saints riders